The year 2007 is the 6th year in the history of the Maximum Fighting Championship, a mixed martial arts promotion based in Canada. In 2007 Maximum Fighting Championship held 5 events beginning with, MFC 11: Gridiron.

Title fights

Events list

MFC 11: Gridiron

MFC 11: Gridiron was an event held on February 3, 2007 at the Shaw Conference Centre in Edmonton, Alberta, Canada.

Results

MFC: Unplugged 3

MFC: Unplugged 3 was an event held on April 20, 2007 at the River Cree Resort and Casino in Edmonton, Alberta, Canada.

Results

MFC 12: High Stakes

MFC 12: High Stakes was an event held on June 22, 2007 at the River Cree Resort and Casino in Edmonton, Alberta, Canada.

Results

MFC 13: Lucky 13

MFC 13: Lucky 13 was an event held on August 24, 2007 at the River Cree Resort and Casino in Edmonton, Alberta, Canada.

Results

MFC 14: High Rollers

MFC 14: High Rollers was an event held on November 23, 2007 at the River Cree Resort and Casino in Edmonton, Alberta, Canada.

Results

See also 
 Maximum Fighting Championship
 List of Maximum Fighting Championship events

References

Maximum Fighting Championship events
2007 in mixed martial arts
Events in Edmonton